The New World quail  are small birds related to the Old World quail, and are named for their similar appearance and habits. The American species are in their the family, the Odontophoridae, whereas Old World quail are in the Phasianidae. The family ranges from Canada through to southern Brazil, and two species, the California quail and the bobwhite quail, have been successfully introduced to New Zealand. The stone partridge and Nahan's partridge, both found in Africa, seem to belong to the family.  Species are found across a variety of habitats from tropical rainforest to deserts, although few species are capable of surviving at very low temperatures. The 34 species are placed in 10 genera.

The legs of most New World quails are short but powerful, with some species having very thick legs for digging. They lack the spurs of many Old World galliformes. Although they are capable of short bursts of strong flight, New World quails prefer to walk, and run from danger (or hide), taking off explosively only as a last resort. Plumage varies from dull to spectacular, and many species have ornamental crests or plumes on their heads. Moderate sexual dichromism is seen in plumage, with males having brighter plumage.

Behaviour and ecology
The New World quails are shy diurnal birds and generally live on the ground; even the tree quails, which roost in high trees, generally feed mainly on the ground. They are generalists with regards to their diet, taking insects, seeds, vegetation, and tubers. Desert species in particular consume seeds frequently.

Most of the information about the breeding biology of New World quails comes from North American species, which have been better studied than those of the Neotropics. The family is generally thought to be monogamous, and nests are constructed on the ground. Clutch sizes are large, as is typical within the Galliformes, ranging from three to six eggs for the tree quail and wood quail, and as high as 10-15 for the northern bobwhite. Incubation takes between 16 and 30 days depending on the species. Chicks are precocial and quickly leave the nest to accompany the parents in large family groups.

Northern bobwhite and California quail are popular gamebirds, with many taken by hunters, but these species have also had their ranges increased to meet hunting demand and are not threatened. They are also artificially stocked.  Some species are threatened by human activity, such as the bearded tree quail of Mexico, which is threatened by habitat loss and illegal hunting.

Species
Subspecies English names by Çınar 2015.

Fossils
 Genus †Miortyx Miller 1944
 †Miortyx teres Miller 1944
 †Miortyx aldeni Howard 1966
 Genus †Nanortyx Weigel 1963
 †Nanortyx inexpectatus Weigel 1963
 Genus †Neortyx Holman 1961
 †Neortyx peninsularis Holman 1961

Phylogeny
Position within the Galliformes. 

Living Odontophoridae based on the work by John Boyd.

See also 
 Quail eggs
 List of Galliformes

References 

 del Hoyo, J.; Elliot, A. & Sargatal, J. (editors). (1994). Handbook of the Birds of the World. Volume 2: New World Vultures to Guineafowl. Lynx Edicions.

External links 
 gbwf.org - Quail, Aviculture & Conservation
 New World quail videos on the Internet Bird Collection

Game birds
 
Quails

Taxa named by John Gould